J. J. Jameson (real name: Norman A. Porter Jr.) is a self-proclaimed poet and activist, who was active in Chicago, Illinois from the mid-1980s until March 2005. His work is marked by an ironic and humorous style.

Background
Jameson is best known for his live performances as a poet and MC at local poetry jams and open mike nights. He also received attention for his September 1999 poetry chapbook, Lady Rutherford's Cauliflower, published by Puddin'head Press, which had been planning to publish a second volume of his work. He was known to be suffering from head tumors in early 2005.  In March 2005 Jameson was named Poet of the Month by C. J. Laity of ChicagoPoetry.com chicagopoetry.com. Friends and acquaintances planned to celebrate the twentieth anniversary of his arrival in Chicago with a roast and poetry reading later in 2005.

On March 22, 2005 at 11:00 he was arrested by the Massachusetts State Police, Illinois State Police and the Massachusetts Department of Correction in Chicago at the Third Unitarian Church, where he was a member of the congregation and sometimes worked as a handyman. Porter was then transferred under armed guard to Massachusetts where he faced charges of escape from a penal institution.

Porter pleaded guilty to charges of second-degree murder in the 1960 fatal shooting of 22-year-old part-time clothing store clerk, John Pigott, at the Robert Hall clothing store in Saugus, Massachusetts with a sawed-off shotgun. In 1961, while awaiting trial on those charges, Porter was involved in the fatal assault in and shooting of the head jailer, David S. Robinson, at Middlesex County jail in Cambridge, Massachusetts and escaped from prison only to be captured while holding up a grocery store in New Hampshire.  He also pleaded guilty to charges of second-degree murder in that case, and was sentenced to two consecutive terms of life imprisonment.

While in prison, Porter earned an undergraduate degree from Boston University, started a prison newspaper, published poetry, and founded a prison radio station.  One of his life sentences was commuted by Governor Michael Dukakis in 1975.  In December 1985, while being held at a prerelease center, he escaped by signing himself out for a walk, and never returned to the facility until he was caught on March 22, 2005.  Since his escape, he had been Massachusetts' most wanted fugitive, ahead of mobster boss James "Whitey" Bulger.

Jameson was connected with Porter when fingerprints taken during a 1993 arrest were  matched against Porter's fingerprints in an FBI database after a police officer saw his picture as Poet of the Month on ChicagoPoetry.com.

On October 14, 2005, Porter was sentenced to three years in prison for his escape. He had a parole hearing Tuesday, October 6, 2009.

The 2008 film Killer Poet, produced by Northern Light Productions, documented the Norman Porter story.

Porter was denied parole by the Massachusetts Parole Board on January 12, 2010. Despite the support of prison officials and members of a Chicago church congregation, the parole board rejected Porter's request because he showed "limited remorse" and "continues to minimize his criminal activity."

Porter was again denied parole on November 19, 2019. He will next be up for parole in 2022. A Massachusetts prisoner, Norman Porter, has been granted parole after serving 42 years in prison on July 5th 2022.

References

Books

Fingerprints Don't Lie

American people convicted of murder
American male poets
American Unitarians
American prisoners sentenced to life imprisonment
American escapees
Criminals from Massachusetts
Escapees from Massachusetts detention
Living people
Prisoners sentenced to life imprisonment by Massachusetts
People convicted of murder by Massachusetts
Year of birth missing (living people)
Writers from Chicago